Markovo may refer to:
Markovo, Russia, name of several inhabited localities in Russia
Markovo, Slovenia, a settlement in the Kamnik Municipality, Slovenia
 Markovo, Croatia, a village near Slatina, Croatia

See also
Markov
Markovo Republic, a self-proclaimed peasant state in Russia from 1905 to 1906
Markovo tepe, a former hill in Plovdiv, Bulgaria